Air Born Indonesia is a national private air charter company established on  December 9, 2010. Air Born is currently based in Sultan Aji Muhammad  Sulaiman Airport, Balikpapan, East Kalimantan.

Air Born specializes in remote air transport  operations for mining, oil and gas companies in transporting their executives, employees and contractors, emergency medical evacuation and  critical spare parts.

Fleet

Current fleet
The Air Born Indonesia fleet includes the following aircraft as of August 2019:

Former fleet
The airline previously operated the following aircraft (at August 2018):
 2 De Havilland Canada DHC-6-300 Twin Otter

Clients

 PT. KALTIM PRIMA COAL (BUMI RESOURCES GROUP)
 PT. ARUTMIN (BUMI RESOURCES GROUP)
 PT. ASMIN KOALINDO TUHUP (BORNEO LUMBUNG ENERGI)
 PT ADARO INDONESIA
 PT. TRANS GLOBAL AVIATION SERVICE  CHALLEDON SERVICES LTD
 PT. KEMBU AIR SERVICE (IRIAN BHAKTI PROJECT)
 PT. SALAMANDER ENERGY (OPHIR ENERGY LTD.)
�

Services

The focus of Air Born business activities, mainly are:
 To provide services for Mining, Oil & Gas companies as follows :
 Long term Air Transport Services Contract for Mining and Petroleum
 Company (on-shore and off-shore operations).
 Short term Air Transport Services Contract.
 Spot Charter arrangements.
 Medical Emergency Evacuation.
 Spot Air Transport for VIP's.
 Aerial Survey
�

References

External links 

 

Airlines of Indonesia
Airlines established in 2010
Indonesian companies established in 2010